Great Ayton is a village and civil parish in the Hambleton District of North Yorkshire, England. The River Leven (a tributary of the River Tees) flows through the village, which lies just north of the North York Moors.

Etymology
Great Ayton's name derives from Old English Ea-tun, meaning 'river farm'. The river flowing through Great Ayton is the Leven, a tributary of the River Tees. A later addition of the word 'great' differentiates the village from nearby Little Ayton.

History 

In the 18th and 19th centuries Great Ayton was a centre for the industries of weaving, tanning, brewing, and tile making.  Subsequently, whinstone for road surfacing was also quarried from the Cleveland Dyke along with ironstone, jet and alum from the Cleveland Hills.

Great Ayton was home to the Great Ayton Friends' School (Quaker) from 1841 until it closed in 1997. The village serves as the base for Cleveland Mountain Rescue Team.

Geography 

Great Ayton is at the foot of the Cleveland Hills beneath Easby Moor and the distinctively-shaped Roseberry Topping.
The River Leven, a tributary of the River Tees, flows through the village and links its two centres, High Green and Low Green.  The Cleveland Dyke, a narrow band of hard whinstone rock that runs for about 31 miles between Robin Hood's Bay and Eaglescliffe lies to the north-east of the village.

From 1894 to 1974, it was in the Stokesley Rural District of the North Riding of Yorkshire. This is in keeping with the Langbaurgh hamlet as a historic meeting place of the Langbaurgh Wapentake. 

According to the 2011 Census, it has a population of 4,629. An electoral ward, of the same name, stretches east to Kildale with a population of 4,973 at the 2011 census .

Transport 
The village is served by Great Ayton railway station on the Esk Valley Line.

Landmarks 

The village landmarks below all relate to James Cook.

 A granite obelisk now marks the original site of the Cook family cottage in Great Ayton. The obelisk is constructed from granite taken from Point Hicks, the first land sighted by Cook in Australia. 
 The Captain Cook Schoolroom Museum is within a former charity school, founded in 1704 by landowner Michael Postgate. James Cook received his early education here from 1736 to 1740.
 Unveiled on 12 May 1997 on High Green is a statue depicting James Cook at the age of 16 looking towards Staithes where, according to tradition, he first felt the lure of the sea. This was commissioned by Hambleton District Council and is the work of sculptor Nicholas Dimbleby.

Religion 

The parish church of Christ Church was built in 1876 and now designated a Grade II listed building. It holds a number of services during the day that attract a total attendance of about 200. 
In the summer months, the evening service takes place in All Saints' Church, the former parish church, which dates back to the 12th century. The church has an organ built by James Jepson Binns. There is also a Methodist Church, Catholic and Religious Society of Friends in the village. James Cook's mother and siblings are buried in the churchyard of All Saints' Church.

Notable people 
The village was the boyhood home of Captain Cook, the British explorer and navigator, who was born in nearby Marton. James Cook and his family moved to the village when he was eight years old and lived there until he was sixteen.
The Cook family home on Bridge Street was built by James' father in 1755. The cottage was dismantled in 1934 to be shipped to Australia. Each stone was numbered so that the cottage could be reconstructed exactly in its new home in the Fitzroy Gardens in Melbourne. 

Cyclist brothers Harry Tanfield (born 1994) and Charlie Tanfield (born 1996), were born in the village. They both share a birthday, 17 November.

References

External links 

 Great Ayton Tourism, Parish Council, and Community Website
 Great Ayton - Information for visitors from Hambleton District Council
 The Captain Cook Schoolroom Museum Website
 

Villages in North Yorkshire
Civil parishes in North Yorkshire
Obelisks in England
Monuments and memorials in North Yorkshire